Uno Free Fall is a 2006 puzzle game released on the Game Boy Advance and mobile phone based on the card game Uno. It is also included on the Nintendo DS 3-in-1 game, Uno / Skip-Bo / Uno Freefall. It was released in the PAL Region on March 2, 2007. It was released in North America on March 6, 2007.

Reception

Uno Free Fall received mixed reviews from critics upon release. On Metacritic, the game holds a score of 62/100 based on 4 reviews, indicating "mixed or average reviews". On GameRankings, the game holds a score of 62.25% based on 4 reviews.

References

Uno (card game) video games
2006 video games
Falling block puzzle games
Game Boy Advance games
Mobile games
Destination Software games
Video games scored by Jake Kaufman
Video games developed in the United States
Black Lantern Studios games
Multiplayer and single-player video games